Onoriode Ehwarieme, also known as Onoriode Ehwarieme  or Godzilla (born 25 November 1987) was an amateur boxer from Nigeria. He qualified for the 2008 Summer Olympics in the super heavyweight division. He turned pro December 5 of 2010.

At the 2nd AIBA African 2008 Olympic Qualifying Tournament held in Windhoek, Namibia, the first and second-place finisher in his division qualified for the Olympics.

He advanced to the finals with a one-point victory over Morris Okola of Kenya 6-5, thus ensuring qualification - Onoriode ultimately took silver in the competition, losing to fellow-qualifier Mohamed Amanissi.

He lost his Olympic debut 1:11 to Jaroslavas

As a professional, he has 20 wins 2 Losses with 19 coming via knockouts. He is currently managed by Nelson Aiyelabowo of LPMG Global.

References

External links

Yahoo data

1987 births
Living people
Olympic boxers of Nigeria
Heavyweight boxers
Boxers at the 2008 Summer Olympics
Nigerian male boxers